The village of Unterbrunn is an Ortsteil (quarter) of the municipality Gauting, in Bavaria, Germany.
It lies close to and east of the Oberpfaffenhofen Airfield (with IATA code: OBF).

Unterbrunn has a Roman Catholic parish church with organ pipes housed above the ceiling.
It also boasts a private museum, basically eclectic but with many historic farm implements.

History
Maria Himmelfahrt Catholic church located in the center of Unterbrunn was built between 1872 and 1875 as a sandstone block building in Romanized forms.

References

External links 
 Official website

Villages in Bavaria